The 2012 Bank of Beijing China Open was a professional ranking snooker tournament that took place between 26 March and 1 April 2012 at the Beijing University Students' Gymnasium in Beijing, China.

Judd Trump was the defending champion, but he lost in the quarter-finals 3–5 against Stephen Lee.

Mark Selby withdrew from his second round match against Ding Junhui due to a neck injury.

Peter Ebdon won his ninth and final ranking title by defeating Stephen Maguire 10–9 in the final.

Prize fund
The breakdown of prize money for this year is shown below: 

Winner: £75,000
Runner-up: £30,000
Semi-final: £18,000
Quarter-final: £10,000
Last 16: £7,500
Last 32: £6,000
Last 48: £2,300
Last 64: £1,500 

Stage one highest break: £200
Stage two highest break: £2,000
Total: £400,000

Wildcard round
These matches were played in Beijing on 26 and 27 March.

Main draw

Final

Qualifying
These matches took place between 21 and 24 February 2012 at the World Snooker Academy, Sheffield, England.

Century breaks

Qualifying stage centuries

 139  Adam Duffy
 137, 129, 129, 105  Sam Craigie
 130, 123, 118, 107  Cao Yupeng
 129  Yu Delu
 128, 108  Alfie Burden
 124  Nigel Bond
 124  Dominic Dale
 122  Tom Ford
 121  Xiao Guodong
 119  David Morris
 116  James Wattana
 115  Luca Brecel
 112, 103  Michael White

 112  Andrew Norman
 108  Adrian Gunnell
 106  Aditya Mehta
 105  Alan McManus
 104  Ryan Day
 104  Ricky Walden
 103, 100  Jamie Cope
 103, 101, 100  Jack Lisowski
 103  Gerard Greene
 102  Jamie Jones
 101  Anthony Hamilton
 101  Peter Ebdon
 100  Joe Perry

Televised stage centuries

 139  Mark Selby
 135  Stephen Hendry
 132  Stephen Maguire
 127  Matthew Stevens
 124, 109, 107, 104, 103, 103  Peter Ebdon
 122  Judd Trump
 119, 114  Lu Ning
 119, 102  Ali Carter

 116  Joe Perry
 113, 107, 100  Stephen Lee
 111  Ding Junhui
 107  John Higgins
 105  Martin Gould
 104, 103  Stuart Bingham
 104  Jimmy White
 102  Ronnie O'Sullivan

References

External links
 2012 Bank of Beijing China Open pictures (by Top147.com) on Facebook

China Open (snooker)
China Open
Open (snooker)
Sports competitions in Beijing